Mustafa Metwalli (born 1949 — died 5 August 2000) was a popular Egyptian movie and stage actor.  He was primarily a comedian, but he played many different roles in Drama .

Personal life
He graduated in 1973 from the Institute of Theatrical Art which is for a long time the only higher education institution available to actors.

He died on August 5, 2000 as a result of a heart attack

His brother-in-law is actor Adel Emam.

Filmography
 Elosta El Modeer.
El Mansy.
 Shams El Zanaty (as seberto).
 Al-Irhabi.
 Esh EL Ghorab.
 Gzert Al Shaytan.
 Antar Shayl Sefo.
 Watch Out for ZouZou.
 Al Le'b M'a al Kobar.
 Al Rakesa Wal Seyasy.
 Al-Karnak.
 Bikhit and Adila 1
 Bikhit and Adila 2
 El Wad Sayed Chaghal (play)
 El Zaeem (play)

External links
 Al-Ahram Weekly: Obituary
 

Egyptian male film actors
1949 births
2000 deaths
Egyptian male television actors
Egyptian male stage actors
20th-century Egyptian male actors